Catherine E. Wolf (August 23, 1908 – July 20, 1969)  was an American amateur tennis player in the 1920s and 1930s. She was born in Jasper, Missouri.

Wolf was ranked the number 10 women's tennis player in the United States in 1934 and 1935.

Career
In 1929, Wolf won the doubles title and was a singles finalist at the Michigan State Championship. In 1930, she won the singles titles at the Western Championship and the Illinois State Championship, and was a doubles finalist (with Eugenie Sampson) in the doubles of the Western Championship.

In 1931, Wolf won the singles title at the Western Championship. She also was the singles runner-up in the Western Indoor Championships in 1932 and 1934.

At the Cincinnati Masters, Wolf made eight finals appearances, winning five titles. She won the singles and doubles titles in 1942 and 1939, and won the doubles title in 1936. Wolf reached the singles and doubles final in 1943 and the mixed doubles final in 1942.

Wolf was a teacher who taught in South Bend, Indiana schools, teaching health and physical education.

Wolf died of a heart attack whilst playing tennis in South Bend on July 20, 1969, aged 60.

References

External links
 Blueblazers: Catherine Wolf Award

People from Elkhart, Indiana
1908 births
1969 deaths
American female tennis players
Tennis people from Indiana